Sergino Rahi Eduard (born 4 September 1994) is a Surinamese professional footballer who plays as a midfielder for SVB Topklasse club Inter Moengotapoe and the Suriname national team.

International career 
Eduard's debut for Suriname came at the age of 19-years-old in a 2–0 win over Bonaire on 14 November 2013. In June 2021 Eduard was called up to the Suriname squad for the 2021 CONCACAF Gold Cup. Eduard played for his country internationally in the Caribbean Cup Qualification, International friendlies, Gold Cup, WC Qualification and CONCACAF  Nations League B and Qualification.

International goals
Scores and results list Suriname's goal tally first.

Honours 
Inter Moengotapoe

 SVB Topklasse: 2015–16, 2018–19
 SVB Cup: 2018–19
 Suriname President's Cup: 2017, 2019

References

External links 

1995 births
Living people
Surinamese footballers
Sportspeople from Paramaribo
Association football midfielders
Suriname international footballers
S.V. Transvaal players
Inter Moengotapoe players
S.V. Notch players
2021 CONCACAF Gold Cup players